Yop, created and marketed by Yoplait, is a yogurt drink sold in supermarkets and convenience stores in Belgium, Canada, France, Ireland, Switzerland, the United Kingdom, and occasionally in the Netherlands, Portugal, Spain and the United States. The Yoplait's Smoothie drink in Sweden and Norway is called Safari. 
Yop is available in a variety of flavours including: banana, blueberry, chocolate, coconut, energy (peach/pineapple/cereal), lemon, mango, peach, raspberry, red fruits, strawberry, strawberry-banana, tropical and vanilla.  Different flavours are available in different markets.

History 
Yop is a product originally from France, and is produced by the yogurt manufacturer Yoplait. Later Yop was marketed to different countries worldwide. Yoplait claims that Yop was the first drinkable yogurt in Canada.

Advertising

UK relaunch
Yoplait commissioned an advertising campaign, from McCann-Erickson, when they re-launched Yop as the "smoother way to start the day" in April 2004. The campaign targeted teenagers with the television advert featuring teenagers singing a parody of the Eddy Grant song, "Gimme Hope Jo'anna". The song was reworked into "Gimme Yop, Me Mama" and the teenagers, who are seen asleep against a toilet-roll holder or propped up in the bathroom, demand that their mothers give them the drink to wake them up.

Availability 
Yop comes within and between countries in different bottle sizes. In some countries the bottle size is indicated in litres in others in grams. Smaller bottles are in some countries called: Yop baby (100 g France), Yop mini (180 g Belgium and France) and YOP & GO (300 g Belgium, 330 g France, 30 cl Switzerland)

˄1: Mini Yop
˄2: P'tit Yop
˄3: YOP & GO

Product information

Storage
Keep refrigerated between 2 °C and 5 °C. It is best to consume shortly after opening. Mini Yop, P'tit Yop
and YOP & GO keeps for up to 8 hours outside the fridge.

Ingredients:
Skim milk, water, sugar, cream, fruit puree1, active bacterial cultures, natural and artificial flavours, modified milk ingredients, concentrated lemon juice, modified corn starch, pectin, locust bean gum, colour, vitamin D3, potassium sorbate, sodium and calcium citrate.
˄1: Only in Yop with fruit flavours

Average nutritional values:

References

External links 
 Yop on Belgian Yoplait Website
 Yop on Canadian Yoplait Website
 Yop on French Yoplait Website
 Yop on Swiss Yoplait Website
 Yop on UK Yoplait website

Brand name yogurts
Drink brands